Hugh Adamson (born 21 April 1885 in  Halbeath, Scotland) was a footballer who played in the Football League for Bolton Wanderers and Everton.

References

Scottish footballers
Dunfermline Athletic F.C. players
Lochgelly United F.C. players
Bolton Wanderers F.C. players
Everton F.C. players
South Liverpool F.C. players
English Football League players
Year of death missing
Association football defenders
1885 births